Conus tribblei, common name Tribble's cone, is a species of sea snail, a marine gastropod mollusk in the family Conidae, the cone snails and their allies.

Like all species within the genus Conus, these snails are predatory and venomous. They are capable of "stinging" humans, therefore live ones should be handled carefully or not at all.

This species was named after the pet cat of Jerry Walls, the original discoverer.

The subspecies Conus tribblei queenslandis da Motta, 1984: is a synonym of Conus queenslandis da Motta, 1984

Description
The size of the shell varies between 42 mm and 138 mm.

Distribution
This marine species occurs off Japan, Taiwan, Vietnam, the Philippines, the Solomon Islands and Australia (Western Australia).

References

 Walls, J.G. 1977. Two New Cones from the Western Pacific. The Pariah 1: 1–3 
 Shikama, T. 1979. Description of new and noteworthy Gastropoda from western Pacific Ocean (II). Science Reports of the Yokosuka City Museum 26: 1–6
 Röckel, D., Korn, W. & Kohn, A.J. 1995. Manual of the Living Conidae. Volume 1: Indo-Pacific Region. Wiesbaden : Hemmen 517 pp. 
 Tucker J.K. & Tenorio M.J. (2013) Illustrated catalog of the living cone shells. 517 pp. Wellington, Florida: MdM Publishing.

External links
 The Conus Biodiversity website
 Cone Shells – Knights of the Sea
 

tribblei
Gastropods described in 1977